Chicoreus (Triplex) florifer, common name : the flowery lace murex,  is a species of sea snail, a marine gastropod mollusk in the family Muricidae, the murex snails or rock snails.

Subspecies and formae
 Chicoreus (Triplex) florifer arenarius (f)  Clench, W.J. & I. Pérez Farfante, 1945 
 Chicoreus (Triplex) florifer dilectus (f) (Adams, A., 1855)  : the Florida lace murex (synonyms : Chicoreus (Triplex) florifer rachelcarsonae (f) Petuch, E.J., 1987; Chicoreus rachelcarsonae Petuch, E.J., 1987)
 Chicoreus (Triplex) florifer emilyae (f)  Petuch, E.J., 1987

Description
The shell size varies between 35 mm and 93 mm. This shell is relatively elongate or fusoid and has a typical muricid outline. Three axial varices are present along its body whorl, each one ornamented by a characteristic row of leafy spines. Between the varices there is a shouldered axial rib. Aperture is small and subcircular. The outer apertural lip is dentate. The surface of the shell may be cream, pale rust-brown or deep brownish black. The interior is usually white.

Distribution
This species is distributed in the Gulf of Mexico, the Caribbean Sea and along North Carolina, Florida and the Bahamas.

References

Further reading
 Rosenberg, G., F. Moretzsohn, and E. F. García. 2009. Gastropoda (Mollusca) of the Gulf of Mexico, Pp. 579–699 in Felder, D.L. and D.K. Camp (eds.), Gulf of Mexico–Origins, Waters, and Biota. Biodiversity. Texas A&M Press, College Station, Texas.
 George E. Radwin, Anthony D'Attilio Murex Shells of the World: An Illustrated Guide to the Muricidae - Page 37

External links
 

Muricidae
Gastropods described in 1846